The 12907 / 12908 Maharashtra Sampark Kranti Express is a bi-weekly Sampark Kranti Express train which runs between  in Mumbai and  in Delhi, India.

Background
This train was introduced as one of the Sampark Kranti trains which were announced by the then railways minister Nitish Kumar in 2004/2005 rail budget. It is a bi-weekly train. Earlier on it would leave  and after a halt at  would go non stop until  except for operational halts. Given the poor patronage to this train, the operational stops were changed to commercial stops. It used to run with ICF coach, but now runs with LHB coach since 15 January 2017.

Coach composition

The train has standard LHB rakes with max speed of 130 kmph. The train consists of 22 coaches:
 1 AC I Tier
 2 AC II Tier
 6 AC III Tier
 8 Sleeper coaches + SLR
 1 Pantry car
 3 General
 1 End-on Generator

Stoppage

Traction

As Western Railway has changed over to AC traction,  is now an operational halt. It is now hauls by a Vadodara-based WAP-7 (HOG) equipped locomotive from end to end.

References

External links
 Bandra Terminus - Hazrat Nizamuddin Maharashtra Sampark Kranti Express on IndiaRailInfo.com
 Hazrat Nizamuddin - Bandra Terminus Maharashtra Sampark Kranti Express on IndiaRailInfo.com

Delhi–Mumbai trains
Railway services introduced in 2004
Sampark Kranti Express trains
Rail transport in Gujarat
Rail transport in Rajasthan